Bastia Umbra is a comune (municipality) in the Province of Perugia in the Italian region Umbria, located about 15 km southeast of Perugia. As of 31 December 2004, it had a population of 20,523 and an area of 27.6 km2.

Bastia Umbra borders the following municipalities: Assisi, Bettona, Perugia, Torgiano.

History
First news of settlements in the area dates from the 11th century AD, although the presence of Roman ruins testify that it was inhabited also in ancient times. In the Middle Ages Bastia was entangled in the struggle between the communes of Assisi and Perugia; in 1319, after a siege of seven months, troops from the latter ravaged it. Bastia was however quickly rebuilt with a new castle and 18 towers. From 1300 to 1594 it was a possession of Perugia, and subsequently of the Papal States. The suffix "Umbra" was added after the annexation to the newly unified Kingdom of Italy in 1860.

Geography
Average altitude: 200 m s.l.m.
Highest point: 215 m s.l.m.
Lowest point: 180 m s.l.m.

In the territory of Bastia Umbra flow three watercourses: the river Chiascio, the ravine Tescio and the Cagnola, a ditch that flows into the river.

Main sights
Church of Santa Croce, built in 1295 in white and pink stone. It has a Gothic façade from 1334.

Demographic evolution

Twin towns
 Höchberg, Germany
 Sant Sadurní d'Anoia, Spain
 Luz-Saint-Sauveur, France

References

External links

Cities and towns in Umbria